The Keys of Middle-earth: Discovering Medieval Literature Through the Fiction of J.R.R. Tolkien is a 2005 book by Stuart Lee and Elizabeth Solopova on understanding J. R. R. Tolkien's Middle-earth fantasy writings in the context of medieval literature, including Old and Middle English and Old Norse, but excluding other relevant languages such as Finnish. The book was broadly welcomed by scholars, who however felt it could have gone further to assist the student. They wrote that it was rather cautious of criticism from other academics; that the texts were rather too brief for much academic study; and that there were small but telling errors in the description of Tolkien's writings. The expanded second edition of 2015 added some new texts.

Book

Publication history 

The Keys of Middle-earth was published in a 284-page paperback in 2005 by Palgrave Macmillan. They published a second, expanded edition with 380 pages in 2015.

Synopsis  

The first part of the book, named 'Introduction', begins with a background about J. R. R. Tolkien, covering his career, the relationship of his Middle-earth fiction to medieval literature, and an overview of his medieval sources. A section then introduces medieval literature in Old English, Middle English and Old Norse. The introduction concludes with five short essays on the thematic and technical parallels between Tolkien's writings and medieval literature, covering the theme of the quest, the epic, the runes, alliterative verse and Tolkien's use of it, and the names that he chooses.

The second part of the book is introduced with a brief chapter, "The Editions", on the approach taken and the selection of medieval texts to pair with the episodes from Tolkien's writings. The body of this part, named "The Texts", offers mainly short excerpts from fourteen medieval literary works in the languages mentioned. Each section consists of a plot summary of the relevant part of Tolkien's story; an introduction to the medieval text; a discussion of Tolkien's use of the text, citing Tolkien scholars such as Tom Shippey; and finally a facing-page (parallel) text and new (rather literal) line-by-line translation if the text is Old English or Old Norse, or no translation but plentiful notes for Middle English.

For The Hobbit, the texts are Völuspá (Gandalf and the Dwarves), Vafþrúðnismál and Solomon and Saturn II (the riddle-game), 
and Beowulf (Smaug the dragon). 

For The Lord of the Rings, the texts are 
Sir Orfeo (the Elves at Rivendell); 
The Ruin (Legolas's "Lament of the Stones"), 
The Fight at Finnsburg and Cynewulf and Cyneheard (The Bridge of Khazad-dum), 
Pearl (The Crossing of the Nimrodel),
Beowulf (Boromir's Death),
Maxims II (Treebeard's List),
The Wanderer and Beowulf (The Rohirrim),
The Battle of Maldon and Homily on the Maccabees (The Battle of the Pelennor Fields),
Sir Gawain and the Green Knight and Beowulf (The Landscape of Mordor), and The Seafarer (The Gray Havens).

The second edition has a similar structure, with the addition of a section on Túrin Turambar and its texts, the Kalevala and the Cowbone whistle; Eärendil and its text, Crist I; two Old English riddles to add to Bilbo and Gollum's riddle game; and Jordanes' Getica to add to the coverage of the Battle of the Pelennor Fields.

Reception 

The book was warmly received by scholars, though they found some issues with it. Kay Marsh, reviewing the book for Studies in the Novel, calls it "an attractive solution" to the "alterity" (otherness) of medieval literature, with a well-chosen selection of texts; she recommends it as "both useful and entertaining". The line-by-line translations make the texts accessible and invite the reader to read sections of untranslated (but copiously glossed) Middle English works like Sir Orfeo. Marsh praises the "well-researched" introduction which covers both Tolkien's career and the study of medieval languages; and notes the "five short essays" on parallels between Middle-earth and the medieval texts. Marsh suggests that there could have been more of a discussion of paleography, the process of creating medieval manuscripts, something that would be new to most of Lee and Solopova's readers.

Miranda Wilcox, in The Medieval Review, calls the book an excellent introduction, both for students to use as a text and as a resource for instructors. It offers a "judicious" selection of recent scholarship in the "compelling context" of the literary phenomenon that is Tolkien's Middle-earth. In her view, the book highlights Tolkien's scholarly "appreciation of both the technical and literary aspects of medieval texts". She finds the facing-page presentation of medieval texts and their translations valuable, illustrating some of the linguistic issues that so fascinated Tolkien.

John Holmes wrote in Tolkien Studies that it has a relatively narrow scope (Old and Middle English, and Old Norse; no Silmarillion, which would have demanded the Finnish Kalevala at least) but provides real depth with "fresh, literal" translations and close examination of the similarities of the sources to Tolkien's writings Holmes finds the book a "first rate" anthology of medieval texts, with "remarkably thorough" notes, but a somewhat nervous guide to Tolkien's works, wary of criticism from other academics.

Michael Drout, in Notes and Queries, writes that while the book is a success in that it achieves most of its goals, it "could have been so much better", if it had avoided so much academic caution, such as quibbling about their title, and gone more boldly for providing a helpful introduction to Tolkien's medievalism for the student. The selection of texts is in his view good, and they are presented and set in context fairly and non-tendentiously, but the fragments are too short for most academic purposes. Drout finds most valuable the quotations from the unpublished lecture notes that Tolkien used at Oxford; in his view, access to this material gave the editors the chance to "make a major contribution to the field which, unfortunately, they did not exploit to the fullest", not helped by listing unpublished manuscripts in "Further reading". He notes "minor but telling" errors, like Aragorn being "haunted" by the rhyme "All that is gold does not glitter" – in fact, he writes, it was composed for Aragorn by Bilbo; or again, the knights of Dol Amroth didn't arrive at the Battle of the Pelennor Fields with Aragorn, as they were already there defending the city of Minas Tirith.

Arden R. Smith, writing in Tolkien Studies, comments that The Keys of Middle-earth is "essentially an anthology" that in Lee and Solopova's words "[draws] out parallels [with Tolkien's fiction] wherever possible", and states that it seems to be meant for an academic readership.

References

Primary
This list identifies each item's location in the book.

Secondary

Sources 

 

2005 non-fiction books
Books about Middle-earth